GammaLink Inc. was an American computer hardware and software company founded in the 1980s in Sunnyvale, California, by Hank Magnuski and Michael Lutz. The company was the first to invent PC-to-fax communications technology, GammaFax.

The company was sold to Dialogic Corporation in 1994, which in turn was bought by Intel. It was then bought by Eicon and subsequently acquired by Open Media Labs, which now functions as Dialogic Media Labs.

Footnotes

External links
GammaLink 3rd Party FAQ Page

1984 establishments in California
1994 disestablishments in California
1994 mergers and acquisitions
American companies established in 1984
American companies disestablished in 1994
Companies based in Sunnyvale, California
Computer companies established in 1984
Computer companies disestablished in 1994
Defunct companies based in California
Defunct computer companies of the United States
Defunct computer hardware companies
Defunct software companies of the United States
Intel
Software companies established in 1984
Software companies disestablished in 1994